Fitzroy Falls Dam in New South Wales, Australia, is part of the Shoalhaven Scheme, completed in 1974.

The  Wildes Meadow Canal connects the reservoir to the Burrawang Pumping Station. The  Burrawang Tunnel and  Canal join the pumping station to the Wingecarribee Reservoir.

Another canal links the reservoir to the Bendeela Pondage via the Bendeela Pumping and Power Station.  This allows the Fitzroy Falls dam to both act as a storage pond for hydroelectric power generation, and to move water from the Tallowa Dam to the Wingecarribee and Warragamba catchments.

See also

List of reservoirs and dams in Australia

References

Dams completed in 1974
Dams in New South Wales